{{DISPLAYTITLE:NZR DF class (1954)}}

The New Zealand DF class locomotive of 1954 was the first class of mainline diesel-electric locomotives built for New Zealand's national railway network, built by English Electric. It should not be confused with General Motors Electro-Motive Division DF class of 1979.

Introduction 
They had a wheel arrangement of  under the UIC classification system, generated 1120 kW (1500 hp) of power, and could achieve a maximum speed of 97 km/h.  They started the process of displacing steam motive power from main lines in New Zealand, but were soon displaced themselves by the DA class of 1955.

Initially, 31 DF locomotives were ordered, but this order was amended to ten DFs and 42 DG class locomotives, which in appearance was essentially half a DF but with a similar bulldog nose cab design. The DF locomotives were heavier than the later and slightly less powerful DAs and were used to haul freight trains on the North Auckland and East Coast Main Trunk lines in Northland and the Bay of Plenty from which the DAs were prohibited by dint of the higher axle loading of the DA class.

The DF class were confined to the North Island, although they did all visit Dunedin for overhaul at Hillside Workshops. The locomotives did not run in service during their journeys to and from Hillside, instead, they were towed. They were allowed to move under their own power once there and haul transfer freight trains to and from  Port Chalmers and Mosgiel as part of tests before returning to service. 

On the arrival of the Phase III DA class locomotives in 1964, the DF class was renumbered from the 1500 series to the 1300 series in November 1965 in order to free up the 1500-series numbers for the new DA locomotives.

Withdrawal 
The DFs were unreliable and needed frequent repairs. This contributed to their short lifespan; withdrawal began in 1972 and the last, DF 1301, was withdrawn in June 1975. A plan to shift the whole fleet to the South Island to join their smaller but more versatile DG siblings was proposed. They were to operate on the hilly Dunedin to Oamaru section of the Main South Line but a new locomotive type was chosen in the DJ class.

Preserved locomotive
DF 1301, the first locomotive built, was donated to the National Federation of Rail Societies NZ (now Federation of Rail Organisations of New Zealand) in 1975. It was placed on static display at Sim Pacific Metals Limited in Auckland, replacing K 900. As part of this it was renumbered to its original number of 1501, but with V-shaped nose stripes in place of the original wing-shaped ones. Initially displayed in the open, a limited shelter was built over the locomotive at a later date although this did not halt the progressive deterioration of the locomotive. Various proposals were put forward for the restoration of the locomotive, but did not amount to anything.

In 2007, with Sims Pacific requiring the area where the DF was located for redevelopment, owners Federation of Rail Organisations of New Zealand concluded an agreement with the Diesel Traction Group (DTG) to have the locomotive moved to their premises for restoration. The first stage of this relocation took place in August 2008 when 1501 was re-railed and then was towed to Westfield Depot for assessment. In January 2009, members of the Group accompanied the locomotive on a three-day 1,100km trip to Christchurch, from where it moved to their Ferrymead Railway base a few days later.

Following the completion of DI 1102 in late 2018, 1501 is now currently undergoing a restoration to mainline condition by the members of the DTG.

References

Citations

Bibliography

External links
 New Zealand Railways Rolling Stock Lists - Class DF (1954)
 | General Arrangement

DF class (English Electric)
NZR DF class
2C-C2 locomotives
3 ft 6 in gauge locomotives of New Zealand
Railway locomotives introduced in 1954